Phyu Phyu Thin (born 23 December 1971) is a Burmese politician and HIV/AIDS activist who served as a House of Representatives MP for Mingala Taungnyunt Township from 2012 until her removal from office in the 2021 Myanmar coup d'état.

Political imprisonment

On May 21, 2007, Phyu Phyu Thin was arrested by police in Yangon for organizing a prayer rally to call for the release of detained National League for Democracy leader Aung San Suu Kyi. Never told what crime she had committed, she was held for more than a month, and was released on July 2, 2007.

As an activist, Phyu Phyu Thin has been an outspoken critic of the State Peace and Development Council, which she says is understating the number of HIV and AIDS cases in Myanmar. She operates a clinic in Yangon that provides treatment, medicine and counseling to HIV and AIDS patients. The United States Department of State also called for Phyu Phyu Thin's release.

While in detention, Phyu Phyu Thin staged a hunger strike, taking only liquids for about one week. Her family, which had not been told where she was being held, said it would file a missing person's case with police.

Phyu Phyu Thin has previously been detained in 2000, after she and other Suu Kyi supporters were bundled away by police from a rally for Suu Kyi. She was held for a time in Insein prison.

International recognition
In 2007, People in Need awarded Phyu Phyu Thin, along with fellow prisoners Su Su Nway and Nilar Thein, their Homo Homini Award.

Political career
Phyu Phyu Thin was elected for a parliamentary seat in the lower house (Pyithu Hluttaw)'s Mingala Taungnyunt constituency, in 2012 by-elections. In the 2015 Myanmar general election,  re-elect Pyithu Hluttaw MP for Mingala Taungnyunt Township.

References

1972 births
Burmese activists
Burmese prisoners and detainees
Living people
Members of Pyithu Hluttaw
HIV/AIDS activists
Burmese democracy activists